CJRC may refer to:

 the Central Japan Railway Company,
 the former name of CKOF-FM.